Miro Kocuvan (born 15 June 1971 in Celje) is a retired Slovenian athlete who specialised in the 400 metres hurdles. He represented his country at the 1996 Summer Olympics, as well as four consecutive World Championships starting in 1993.

Kocuvan's personal best in the event is 49.43 seconds set in Bari in 1997 when winning the bronze medal at the 1997 Mediterranean Games. His father, Miro Kocuvan Sr., was a sprinter.

Competition record

References

1971 births
Living people
Slovenian male hurdlers
Yugoslav male hurdlers
Olympic athletes of Slovenia
Athletes (track and field) at the 1996 Summer Olympics
World Athletics Championships athletes for Slovenia
Sportspeople from Celje
Mediterranean Games bronze medalists for Slovenia
Mediterranean Games medalists in athletics
Athletes (track and field) at the 1993 Mediterranean Games
Athletes (track and field) at the 1997 Mediterranean Games